Deniz Almas (born 17 July 1997) is a German athlete. He competed in the men's 4 × 100 metres relay event at the 2020 Summer Olympics.

Personal life
Almas was born in Germany and is of Turkish descent.

References

External links
 

1997 births
Living people
German male sprinters
German people of Turkish descent
Athletes (track and field) at the 2020 Summer Olympics
Olympic athletes of Germany
People from Calw
Sportspeople from Karlsruhe (region)
21st-century German people